HD 2039 is a yellow dwarf or yellow subgiant star in the constellation Phoenix. The star is not visible to the naked eye, and lies 280 light years away from the Sun. HD 2039 is a relatively stable star, and an exoplanet at least three times the mass of the planet Jupiter has been discovered in its orbit; this exoplanet, known as HD 2039 b, was the 100th exoplanet to be discovered.

Nomenclature
The designation HD 2039 from the Henry Draper Catalogue. The catalogue, which was published between 1918 and 1924, was based on the work of Annie Jump Cannon and her team between 1911 and 1915. HD 2039 does not have a common, colloquial name that is characteristic of stars like Sirius, Procyon, and Aldebaran.

Characteristics
HD 2039 is a stable G-type star, meaning it shines with white light that can be seen in the Sun. HD 2039 exhibits a radius approximately 40 percent larger than the Sun's. The star is slightly hotter than the Sun; while HD 2039 has a temperature of 5935 K, the Sun's surface temperature lies nearly 200 kelvins lower at 5778 K. HD 2039 is unusually metal-rich, which has attracted the attention of astrophysicists.

Distance and visibility
The star's magnitude as observed from Earth is 9; this signifies that the body is not visible with the naked eye, but can be seen with a telescope. HD 2039 lies roughly 280 light years from the Sun, which is about as far from the Sun as the second brightest star in the night sky, Canopus.

Planetary system
In 2002, a planet was found by the Anglo-Australian Planet Search team to be orbiting the star in a very eccentric orbit. It has a minimum mass more than four times that of Jupiter and has an orbital period of over three years. The planet orbits its star at a distance of approximately two AU away; the planet Earth, in comparison, orbits at a distance of one AU away from the Sun. HD 2039 b's discovery was reported quietly; no press release was provided by the observatory that discovered the star's planet, and no formal announcement of the planet's existence was made. The entity was the 100th exoplanet to have been verified by the scientific community.

See also
 List of extrasolar planets

References

External links
 The Extrasolar Planets Encyclopaedia: HD 2039
 

G-type main-sequence stars
G-type subgiants
002039
001931
Phoenix (constellation)
Planetary systems with one confirmed planet
Durchmusterung objects